Rajasthan is a 1999 Tamil language action thriller  film directed by R. K. Selvamani. The film stars Sarathkumar and Vijayashanti, while Thalaivasal Vijay, Manivannan, Vadivelu and Devan play supporting roles. The film was later dubbed into Telugu language under the same name, with some scenes re-shot with local actors.

Cast

Sarathkumar as Hariharan
Vijayashanti as Gayathri
Srividya
Thalaivasal Vijay as Police officer
Manivannan as cook (Brahmanandam in Telugu)
Prithviraj
Vadivelu (Ali in Telugu)
Devan
Prakash Raj as Terrorist
Manjula as Terrorist
Thalapathy Dinesh
Ajay Rathnam
Satya Prakash as Sadam
Mohan Raman
 Alphonsa (special appearance)

Soundtrack

Tamil
"Jai Jawan" - Arunmozhi, T. L. Maharajan
"Machan" - S. Janaki, K. S. Chithra
"Jil Jilara - Mano, Sunandha
"Sorgathil" - Shankar Mahadevan
"Siragadikkra" -   S. N. Surendar

Telugu
"Chilaka Chilaka"
"Jai Jawan"
"Kova Billa"
"Mama Mama"
"Swargamlo"

References

External links

1999 films
Indian action films
Films shot in Rajasthan
Films scored by Ilaiyaraaja
Indian multilingual films
1990s Tamil-language films
Indian Army in films
Films about terrorism in India
Films set in Rajasthan
1999 multilingual films
Films directed by R. K. Selvamani